Men Against the Sea is the second novel in the trilogy by Charles Nordhoff and James Norman Hall about the mutiny aboard HMS Bounty. It is preceded by Mutiny on the "Bounty" and followed by Pitcairn's Island. The novel first appeared in serial form in The Saturday Evening Post from November 18, 1933 through December 9, 1933, hence the copyright date of 1933. It was first printed in hardcover in January 1934 by Little, Brown and Company.

Plot summary 
Men Against the Sea follows the journey of Lieutenant William Bligh and the eighteen men set adrift in an open boat by the mutineers of the Bounty.  The story is told from the perspective of Thomas Ledward, the Bounty's acting surgeon, who went into the ship's launch with Bligh.  It begins after the main events described in the novel and then moves into a flashback, finishing at the starting point.

Principal characters 
 Lieutenant William Bligh, Acting Captain
 John Fryer, Sailing Master
 Thomas Ledward, Acting Surgeon
 David Nelson, Botanist
 William Cole, Boatswain
 William Elphinstone, Master's Mate
 William Purcell, Carpenter

External links
 
 Men Against the Sea, Project Gutenberg

1934 American novels
Novels about HMS Bounty
Little, Brown and Company books
Novels about survival skills
Collaborative novels